Roman Dworzyński (born 8 June 1934) is a Polish chess player, Polish Chess Championship medalist (1955).

Chess career
Roman Dworzyński achieved his first chess successes in 1951, winning in Zakopane the title of vice-champion of Polish Junior Chess Championship and making his debut in Łódź in the Polish Chess Championship final. Until 1957 Roman Dworzyński participated in all seven finals. His greatest success in 1955 in Wrocław, where he won the silver medal. Thanks to this success, he qualified for the national team and performed at 12th Chess Olympiad in Moscow where on the 3rd board he scored 8½ points in 15 games. In 1955 Roman Dworzyński appeared in an international chess tournament in Erfurt, and a year later in Marianske Lazne, but he did not achieve success in them. He has the title of National Master. In 1958 Roman Dworzyński practically ended his chess career, in the following years he sporadically appeared in team chess tournaments.

References

External links

Roman Dworzyński chess games at 365Chess.com

1934 births
Living people
Polish chess players
Chess Olympiad competitors
20th-century chess players